Aisha Luvenia Humphrey, known professionally as Kitten Kuroi, is an American singer, vocal arranger, songwriter, producer and actress. She is known for her work as a background vocalist for Elvis Costello. Kuroi performed with Costello on his 2018 Look Now album, which won a Grammy Award for Best Traditional Pop Vocal Album during the 62nd Annual Grammy Awards.

Biography

Kuroi graduated from California State University, and previously wrote for mxdwn.com. She arranged background vocals and performed in Mike Garson's "A Bowie Celebration"  2022, alongside artists Def Leppard, Duran Duran, Gary Oldman, Judith Hill, Walk the Moon, Bernard Fowler, Gretchen Parlato and more. She was a part of the house band, featuring David Bowie's original bandmates; Mike Garson, Carmine Rojas, Gerry Leonard, Charlie Sexton, Alan Childs.

Kuroi has also performed and toured with other artists including Paul Stanley, Kate Hudson, Mykki Blanco, Pentatonix, Niki, Engelbert Humperdinck, Scotty Grand, Natasha Bedingfield, John Lloyd Young, Blondie,,Shanice, TJ Wilkins of "The Voice", Scott Page's Think:EXP (all-star celebrity rockstar Pink Floyd Tribute Band ft. Fishbone's Norwood Fisher, Jane's Addiction's Stephen Perkins, Michael Jackson's Eric Mayron, Kid Rock's Kenny Olson, Guns & Roses' Roberta Freeman) and Theo Parrish (appearing as featured vocalist on his 2017 single, "Ghetto Proposal Pt. 1"). She was featured on the "A Proposal With a Twist" episode of the Oprah Winfrey Network's show Real Life: The Musical.

Kuroi has sung in multiple languages such as Spanish, Persian, Hebrew, Italian, Japanese, Korean and Swahili.

Awards

Kuroi sang on Elvis Costello & The Imposters' studio album, "Look Now", won the Grammy Award for Best Traditional Pop Vocal Album at the 62nd Grammy Awards.  After years of nominations, Look Now is the first Grammy Award Elvis Costello & The Imposters won together as a band. The album was co-produced by Sebastian Krys and features three songs co-written by Burt Bacharach. Carole King co-wrote "Burnt Sugar Is So Bitter", one of the singles featuring Kuroi's vocals.

AllMusic asserts that the album “feels like a cross between Imperial Bedroom and Painted from Memory, Costello's 1998 collaboration with Burt Bacharach.", adding that the album "isn't rock & roll so much as it is pop that blends the craft of classic Brill Building tunes of the '60s with the narrative maturity of classic Broadway musicals and the sort of ballads that were once the purview of classic jazz vocalists". A reviewer for The Associated Press described the album as a series of lamentations by various characters.

Associated Acts

·Paul Stanley
·Elvis Costello
·Niki
·Linda Perry
·Engelbert Humperdinck
·Natasha Bedingfield
·Daniel Bedingfield
·Theo Parrish
·Frenchie Davis
·Chicano Batman
·Jon B
·Scotty Grand
·Tommy Faragher
·Faragher Brothers
·Steve Nieve
·Pete Thomas
·Yahzarah
·Lauren Evans
·New Kids on the Block
·Lady Gaga
·Mike Garson
·Charlie Sexton
·Carmine Rojas
·Gerry Leonard
·Alan Childs
·Carole King
·Gretchen Parlato
·Judith Hill
·Gaby Moreno
·Joe Elliott
·Joe Sumner
·Gary Oldman
·Def Leppard
·Duran Duran
·Simon Le Bon
·Bernard Fowler
·Walk The Moon
·Nicholas Petricca
·Brandon Jenner
·Jake Wesley Rogers
·The Section Quartet
·Maiya Sykes
·Matt Pinfield
·Blondie
·Debbie Harry
·Matthew Katz-Bohen
·Chris Stein
·Clem Burke
·Justin Warfield
·John Lloyd Young
·Scott Page
·Norwood Fisher
·Stephen Perkins
·Roberta Freeman
·Leddie Garcia
·Mykki Blanco
·Kate Hudson
·Kamasi Washington
·Saul Williams
·Living Colour
·Vernon Reid
·Angelo Moore
·Fishbone
·Bulletboys
·Fernando Perdomo
·Pentatonix
·Sharlotte Gibson
·Kenya Hatahway
·Rickey Minor
·Andy Samberg
·Chris Isaak
·LeAnn Rimes
·Queen Latifah
·Dan Wilson
·Semisonic
·Andra Day
·Lou Gramm
·Paul Roessler
·Phideaux

Veganism

Kuroi is a vegan and was featured in the documentary short, Vegan Noir: Black Vegans in Los Angeles.

References

1980 births
21st-century American women
American multi-instrumentalists
American veganism activists
American women singers
California State University, Fullerton alumni
Living people